This is a list of notable and well-known Belizean people, ordered alphabetically.

 Michael Anthony Ashcroft, international businessman, philanthropist and politician
 Moses Michael Levi Barrow (born Jamal Michael Barrow; 1978), better known by his stage name Shyne, rapper and politician
 Simone Biles, American gymnast and Olympian
 Pi'erre Bourne, rapper and record producer
 Barry Bowen, bottling magnate, politician and entrepreneur
 Lova Boy, recording artist and entrepreneur
 Sharon Carr, murderer who killed a woman in Britain aged only 12
 Nadia Cattouse, actress, singer-songwriter
 Pen Cayetano, artist and musician
 Sue Courtenay, architect
 Ivan Duran, musician, and the founder and director of Stonetree Records 
 Zee Edgell, novelist and educator, considered Belize's principal contemporary writer
 Maxime Faget, designer of the Mercury capsule, and contributed 
 Antonio Soberanis Gómez, activist in the Belizean labour movement, he founded the Labourers and Unemployed Association in 1934 to demand poverty relief work and a minimum wage. He was jailed for sedition in 1935
 Samuel Alfred Haynes, soldier, activist and poet
 Houston (of Belizean descent), R&B singer, best known for the hit single "I Like That"
 Marion Jones (holds dual-citizenship), former world champion track and field athlete, and a former professional basketball player for Tulsa Shock in the WNBA
 Emory King, historian, author, journalist and National Film Commissioner
 Chito Martínez, first Belizean player in the history of Major League Baseball (MLB)
 John McAfee, British-American computer programmer and founder of McAfee, Inc.
 Deon McCaulay, international footballer who last played for R.G. City Boys United in the Premier League of Belize
 Monrad Metzgen, national hero of Belize
 Andy Palacio, punta musician and government official. He was also a leading activist for the Garínagu and their culture
 Milton Palacio (holds dual-citizenship), Belizean American professional basketball player, currently with the Lithuanian team Lietuvos rytas
 Elijio Panti, traditional healer who used Mayan herbal medical techniques
 Wilfred Peters, accordionist and band leader, known as the "King of Brukdown"
 Arlie Petters, mathematical physicist, who is the Benjamin Powell Professor and Professor of Mathematics, Physics, and Business Administration at Duke University
 George Cadle Price, the first prime minister of Belize, considered to have been one of the principal architects of the country's independence
Francis Reneau, pianist and composer. In 1994 he was commissioned by the government to produce a representative compilation of Belizean music 
 Gerald Rhaburn, calypso, soca, reggae and brukdown musician
 Marie Sharp, entrepreneur
 Shyne, rapper and convert to Judaism
 Lisa Tucker (of Belizean descent), singer, musical theater and television actress
 Deborah L. Turbiville, Houston madam
 Ann-Marie Williams, public policy advisor
 Selwyn Walford Young, musician and composer

References

See also

List of people by nationality